Susannah Kate Constance Fish  is a retired career police officer who was awarded the OBE for services to policing in the 2008 Queen’s Birthday Honours.

Biography 
A graduate from London School of Economics joining Nottinghamshre Police in 1986, she received three Chief Constable’s Commendations for professionalism, dedication and courageous leadership. She received the Queen's Police Medal for distinguished service in the 2016 Birthday Honours.

Fish was Deputy Chief Constable of Nottinghamshire Police, being acting Chief Constable from 2016 until 2017, having delayed her scheduled retirement for nine months to cover the absence of Chief Constable Chris Eyre. During her time in the police force she had responsibility for the Force Crime Directorate, Force Intelligence Directorate, Scientific Support, Operational Support, Serious & Organised Crime and is also a Gold Firearms, Public Order and CBRN Commander.

Fish has spoken about the 'toxic culture of sexism' in the police force, and about her own experience of sexual assault by colleagues. She was awarded Law Enforcement Upstander of the Year in the National Hate Crime Awards 2016 for her leadership on misogyny as a hate crime.

Fish has established her own consultancy and has been Nottingham Business Awards Woman Achiever of the Year. She sits on the board of governors of Nottingham Trent University, and was awarded an  honorary Doctor of Laws degree by the University of Nottingham in 2018.

Fish was elected as a parish councillor for Wing, Rutland in 2019.

References 

British police officers
Living people
English recipients of the Queen's Police Medal
Members of the Order of the British Empire
Alumni of the London School of Economics
Year of birth missing (living people)
Violence against women in England